Autódromo Pedro Cofiño is a  race track located in Escuintla, Guatemala. The race track was inaugurated in 2002 as Autódromo Los Volcanes. In 2007 it was renamed after the late Guatemalan racing driver Pedro Cofiño.

Fatalities

Pedro Cofiño was killed when he was hit in the circuit's pitlane by another car.

References

Motorsport venues in Guatemala
Escuintla Department